Philip II Philoromaeus ("Friend of the Romans") or Barypous (Βαρύπους, "Heavy-foot"), a ruler of the Hellenistic Seleucid Empire, was the son of the Seleucid king Philip I Philadelphus, and the last Seleucid king.

Biography
Philip II himself briefly ruled parts of Syria in the 60s BC, as a client king under Pompey. He competed with his second cousin Antiochus XIII Asiaticus for the favours of the great Roman general, but Pompey would have none of them and had Antiochus murdered. No coins of Philip II are known, which is unusual for Seleucid rulers (the ephemeral Seleucus V Philometor is the only other king for whom this is the case).  This may indicate that Philip did not rule in any of the mint cities.

Philip may have survived his deposition: a Seleucid prince Philip is mentioned as a prospective bridegroom to queen Berenice IV of Egypt, sister of Cleopatra VII in 56 BC. The union was, however, checked by the Roman governor of Syria Aulus Gabinius who probably had Philip II killed.

Philip himself was indeed an insignificant pawn, but with him ended eleven generations of Seleucid kings, arguably some of the most influential rulers of the Hellenistic world.

See also

 List of Syrian monarchs
 Timeline of Syrian history

References

Citations

Sources

External links
Livius entry by Jona Lendering 

1st-century BC Seleucid rulers
1st-century BC rulers in Asia

Seleucid rulers

50s BC deaths

Year of birth unknown

Year of death uncertain
Roman client rulers
People of Roman Syria
Phillip 02